The 2023 Monterrey Challenger was a professional tennis tournament played on hard courts. It was the thirteenth edition of the tournament which was part of the 2023 ATP Challenger Tour. It took place in Monterrey, Mexico from 20 to 26 February 2023.

Singles main draw entrants

Seeds

 1 Rankings are as of 13 February 2023.

Other entrants
The following players received wildcards into the singles main draw:
  Ernesto Escobedo
  Rodrigo Pacheco Méndez
  James Van Deinse

The following player received entry into the singles main draw using a protected ranking:
  Bradley Klahn

The following players received entry from the qualifying draw:
  Guido Andreozzi
  Nick Chappell
  Jesse Flores
  Bernard Tomic
  Denis Yevseyev
  Evan Zhu

Champions

Singles

  Nuno Borges def.  Borna Gojo 6–4, 7–6(8–6).

Doubles

  André Göransson /  Ben McLachlan def.  Luis David Martínez /  Cristian Rodríguez 6–3, 6–4.

References

Monterrey Challenger
February 2023 sports events in Mexico
2023 in Mexican tennis